Daddy-O is a 1958 B-movie starring Dick Contino.

Daddy-O may also refer to:
Daddy-O Daylie, a radio personality in the 1940s, 1950s and 1960s
Daddy-O (rapper), rapper and hip hop producer
"Daddy-O", a 2008 song by Wideboys
Bob "Daddy-O" Wade, American artist associated with the Cosmic Cowboy culture of Texas

See also
Daddy O, Baby O!, a 2000 Filipino film